Childeric III ( 717 –  754) was King of Francia from 743 until he was deposed by Pope Zachary in 751 at the instigation of Pepin the Short. Although his parentage is uncertain, he is considered the last Frankish king from the Merovingian dynasty. Once Childeric was deposed, Pepin the Short, who was the father of emperor Charlemagne, was crowned king, initiating the Carolingian dynasty.

Background

Following the reign of Dagobert I (629–634), the power of the Merovingian kings gradually declined into a ceremonial role, while the real power in the Frankish kingdom was increasingly wielded by the mayors of the palace. In 718, Charles Martel combined the roles of mayor of the palace of Neustria and mayor of the palace of Austrasia, consolidating his position as the most powerful man in Francia. After the death of king Theuderic IV in 737, the throne remained vacant, and Charles Martel became de facto king.

After Charles Martel's death in 741, Carloman and Pepin the Short, his sons by his first wife Rotrude, became co-mayors of the palace. However, they soon faced revolts from their younger half-brother Grifo and their brother-in-law Odilo, Duke of Bavaria. These revolts may have played a part in their decision to fill the throne with a Merovingian king after a six-year vacancy to add legitimacy to their reigns.

Life

Childeric's parentage and his relation to the Merovingian family are uncertain. He may have been either the son of Chilperic II or Theuderic IV. However, he may have been totally unrelated, and simply a puppet used by the Mayors.

According to Einhard, Charlemagne's biographer, Childeric took little part in public business and would, once a year, be brought in an ox cart led by a peasant and preside at court on a throne, giving answers prepared by the mayors to visiting ambassadors. In this narrative, he had neither political or economic power, depending on his own small estate and on mayoral support.

After Carloman retired to a monastery in 747, Pepin resolved to take the royal crown for himself.  Pepin sent letters to Pope Zachary, asking whether the title of king belonged to the one who had exercised the power or the one with the royal lineage. The pope responded that the real power should have the royal title as well. In 751 Childeric was dethroned by Pope Zachary and tonsured. His long hair was the symbol of his dynasty and thus the royal rights or magical powers; by cutting it, they divested him of all royal prerogatives. Once dethroned, he and his son Theuderic were placed in the monastery of Saint-Bertin or in Saint-Omer and Theuderic in Saint-Wandrille.

There are conflicts in information of exactly when he died with some references citing as early as 753 and other references saying it was as late as 758.  Under the Carolingians, he received bad press, being called a rex falsus, false king, despite the fact that it was Pepin through Popes Zachary and Stephen II who raised him to his throne.

References

Sources

Further reading 

Junghans, W. Die Geschichte der fränkischen Konige Childerich und Clodovech. Göttingen, 1857.
Chiflet, J. J., Anastasis Childerici I Francorum regis. Antwerp, 1655.
Cochet, J. B. D. Le Tombeau de Childeric I, roi des Francs. Paris, 1859.
Lavisse, E. Histoire de France, Vol. II. Paris, 1903.
Wallace-Hadrill, J. M., translator. The Fourth Book of the Chronicle of Fredegar with its Continuations. Greenwood Press: Connecticut, 1960.
Wallace-Hadrill, J. M. The Long-Haired Kings. London, 1962.
Einhard. Annales Regni Francorum.

710s births
750s deaths
Merovingian kings
Year of birth uncertain
8th-century Frankish kings